Mañana te cuento 2 is a 2008 Peruvian romantic comedy-drama film written and directed by Eduardo Mendoza de Echave. It is a sequel to the 2005 film Mañana te cuento. Starring Melania Urbina, Bruno Ascenzo, Giovanni Ciccia, Oscar Beltrán, Vanessa Jerí and Leisy Suárez. It premiered on February 14, 2008, in Peruvian theaters.

Synopsis 
It's been four years since the nightlife changed for these four friends who hadn't finished school yet. The friendship of three of them survived that intense night, now they live together and try to make this inevitable transition to adulthood less harsh and more fleeting. However, a character from the past will come to complicate things in an unexpected and dizzying way, forcing them to make decisions for which they may not feel prepared. Efraín and the fat man will go from a crazy night to one of their worst nightmares and Manuel will have a reunion with Bibiana that will definitely set the course of their lives this time.

Cast 
The actors participating in this film are:

 Melania Urbina as Bibiana
 Bruno Ascenzo as Manuel
 Giovanni Ciccia as Alfredo
 Oscar Beltrán as Efraín
 José Manuel Peláez as "El gordo"
 Vanesa Jeri as Lorena
 Leisy Suárez as Sandra
 Diego Lombardi as Raúl
 Magdyel Ugaz as Female Kidnapper
 Paul Ramírez as Male Kidnapper
 Américo Zúñiga as Trucha
 Nora Cafetara as Bibiana's grandmother
 Marco Zunino as Casino boy

Reception 
Mañana te cuento 2 got 34,000 viewers on its first day in theaters. The film drew 188,895 viewers after 5 weeks in theaters.

References

External links 

 

2008 films
2008 romantic comedy-drama films
Peruvian romantic comedy-drama films
2000s Spanish-language films
2000s Peruvian films
Films set in Peru
Films shot in Peru
Films about friendship
Peruvian sequel films